

This page lists board and card games, wargames, miniatures games, and tabletop role-playing games published in 1983.  For video games, see 1983 in video gaming.

Games released or invented in 1983

Game awards given in 1983
 Spiel des Jahres: Scotland Yard

Significant games-related events in 1983
Decipher, Inc. founded.

See also
 1983 in video gaming

Games
Games by year